The following is a timeline of the history of the borough of Worthing, West Sussex, England.

13th century
 1218 - By 1218 the manor of Ordinges had become known as Wurddingg.
 c.1245 - St Richard of Chichester, Sussex's patron saint, lives in Tarring at the house of Simon, parish priest of Tarring
 1291 - Worthing's medieval chapel is mentioned for the first time

14th century
 1300 - Worthing harbour first recorded
 1324 - Worthing harbour is recorded as being a member of Shoreham Port

15th century
 1410 - Worthing's medieval chapel is recorded as being used for mass

16th century
 1539 - Worthing becomes the property of Anthony Browne, 1st Viscount Montagu
 1575 - Worthing chapel is recorded as being in private ownership
 1584 - John Selden, jurist, legal antiquary and oriental scholar was born in Salvington

17th century
 1643 - St Symphorian's Church, Durrington is partly destroyed by Parliamentarian parishioners
 1644 - The Spanish warship the Santiago (St James), is beached at Heene.
 1682 - William Penn, founder of Pennsylvania sails across the Atlantic for the first time. His ship, the Welcome lands at Worthing to pick up at least 16 people from Sussex as it sails from the Kent port of Deal to New Castle, Delaware
 1684 - William Penn lands in Worthing on his way from the Province of Pennsylvania to his home in Warminghurst

18th century
 1750 - High Salvington Windmill is built
 1759 - John Luther builds a large lodging house at the south end of High Street
 1773 - There is said to be a 'great fishery' at Worthing
 1789 - George Greville, 4th Earl of Warwick buys Luther's house, renaming it Warwick House
 1797 - Castle Goring is built
 1798 - Princess Amelia visits Worthing

19th century
 1801 - Population: 2,151
 1802
 A new toll road is constructed from Worthing to West Grinstead. Teville Gate tollgate is built where the new road crosses the Teville Stream
 Thomas Trotter opens a barn theatre in High Street
 1803
 Worthing is given town status and Timothy Shelley chairs the first meeting of the Worthing Town Commissioners at the Nelson Inn on South Street
 Worthing's population approximately 2,500
 1805 - Jane Austen visits Worthing
 1807
 Princess Charlotte visits Worthing
 New Theatre (later Theatre Royal) opens on Ann Street
 1810 - Charles and William Phillips publish Percy Bysshe Shelley's first published volume of poetry, Original Poetry by Victor and Cazire
 1811 - Charles and William Phillips publish Percy Bysshe Shelley's The Necessity of Atheism
 1812 - St Paul's chapel of ease opens
 1814
 Thomas Young makes "a number of original and insightful innovations" in deciphering Egyptian hieroglyphs on the Rosetta Stone
 Queen Caroline visits Worthing on her way to Brunswick
 1815 - Two infants' schools open
 1817 - Jane Austen begins work on Sanditon, the unfinished novel based significantly on her time in Worthing
 1820 - Beach House is built
 1823
 The Teville Gate tollgate is removed following protests
 A large oyster bed is discovered 3–4 miles south-south-west of Worthing and is fished by Worthing and Brighton fishermen
 1829 - Princess Augusta visits Worthing
 1830 - Protesters in Broadwater demand a tithe reduction and a crowd of 200 people gather in Worthing town centre in Swing protests
 1832 - Excise officers open fire on Worthing's last smuggling gang, shooting William Cowerson dead
 1833 - Park Crescent is completed to designs by Amon Henry Wilds
 1834 - Christ Church is opened
 1835 - Worthing's first Town Hall opens
 1838 - The Worthing Institution or Mechanics Institution is founded on Marine Parade to provide cheap information about literature, science and art
 1845 - Railway is extended from Shoreham to Worthing
 1849 - First recorded Worthing Regatta
 1850 - 11 local fishermen drown as they set out to save the crew of the Lalla Rookh
 1855 - Worthing Cricket Club is formed
 1856 - Worthing Intelligencer newspaper first published
 1861
 Queen Marie Amelie of France stays in Worthing when in exile from France
 The Sussex Coast Mercury (later the Worthing Mercury) newspaper is first published
 1862
 Worthing Pier opens
 C.A. Elliott uses glass from the Great Exhibition of 1851 for glass-houses to grow grapes for sale
 1863 - Worthing Express newspaper, a local version of the Sussex Express is first published
 1864 - St Mary of the Angels, Worthing opens as Worthing's first post-reformation Catholic church
 1867 - Augustus Lane-Fox excavates part of Cissbury Ring
 1881 - Worthing Hospital is opened as Worthing Infirmary
 1884 - Skeleton Army riots
 1886
 The church of St Andrew the Apostle with the 'Worthing madonna' opens to some controversy
 Worthing F.C. is formed
 1890
 Worthing receives a royal charter and becomes a borough
 Alfred Cortis is elected as Worthing's first mayor
 The Worthing School of Art and Science is founded
 1892 - A permanent soup kitchen and distribution centre for coal, soup and bread is established in Grafton Road
 1893 - An outbreak of typhoid fever causes 200 fatalities
 1894 - Oscar Wilde stays at Worthing and writes The Importance of Being Earnest
 1896 - The first moving picture show in Worthing is shown at Worthing Pier
 1898 - William Kennedy Dickson makes a film of a water polo game involving Worthing Swimming Club, one of the earliest films of a sports team
 1899 - Worthing is described as "a town of hot houses" with so many hot houses established for market gardening

20th century
 1902 - The borough of Worthing is extended to include parts of Broadwater and West Tarring
 1908
 Worthing Museum and Art Gallery opens
 King Edward VII stays at Beach House for the first time
 Worthing's first fire station is built on High Street
 1909 - Sir Frederick Stern purchases a site on Highdown Hill that becomes Highdown Gardens
 1910 - Ellen Chapman is elected to Worthing Council, one of the first female councillors in the UK
 1911 - Carl Adolf Seebold opens the Dome Cinema as the Kursaal
 1914 - The Connaught Theatre opens, initially as the Picturedrome cinema
 1920 - Worthing Herald newspaper first published
 1924 - The first Worthing Tramocars service runs along the town's seafront
 1926 - The Worthing Symphony Orchestra is founded
 1929
 The borough of Worthing is extended to include Goring-by-Sea and Durrington
 Vaughan Cornish and the Campaign for the Protection of Rural England submit a memorandum to the Prime Minister urging the case for national parks including on the South Downs between the rivers Arun and Adur
 1930 - Charles Bentinck Budd is elected to the town council
 1931 - Population: 45,905
 1933
 The borough of Worthing is extended to include the west of Sompting and the south of Findon
 Worthing Rural District is created as the local authority for places surrounding Worthing
 Worthing Corporation begins the purchase of 1000 acres of open downland as part of the Worthing Downland Estate
 Worthing's New Town Hall opens
 1934 - The Battle of South Street takes place between Fascists and anti-fascists
 1936
 Emperor Haile Selassie and his family spend six weeks in Worthing following Italy's invasion of Abyssinia
 Brighton, Hove and Worthing Municipal Airport (now Brighton City Airport) is officially opened
 1939 - Population: 55,584
 1942 - Canadian soldiers based in Worthing take part in the Dieppe Raid
 1944 - The British Army's 4th Armoured Brigade set up headquarters in the Eardley Hotel
 1945 - Sir Otho Prior-Palmer becomes Worthing's first Member of Parliament
 1948 - Post-war housing planned by Charles Cowles-Voysey is built using Prisoner of War labour
 1951 - Population: 67,305
 1960 - Beecham factory (now GSK plc) opens in Broadwater
 1961 - Population: 77,155
 1964
 Sir Terence Higgins becomes the second person to represent Worthing as its Member of Parliament
 Harold Pinter writes The Homecoming at his home in Ambrose Place
 1966
 Worthing's Old Town Hall is demolished
 Sussex Downs Area of Outstanding Natural Beauty is designated
 1969
 Worthing hosts the opening stage of cycling's Milk Race (now the Tour of Britain)
 Hill Barn Golf Club hosts the Penfold Tournament, part of the European Tour, for the first time
 1970 - Phun City music festival is held in fields outside of Worthing
 1971 - Population: 88,467
 1972 - Worthing hosts its first World Bowls Championship
 1974
 Worthing Council is reformatted as Worthing Borough Council
 Worthing College formed as Worthing  Sixth Form College
 1976 - Worthing Borough Council is led by the Conservative Party for the first time
 1981
 Population: 90,686
 The West Worthing Tennis Club (relocated from West Worthing to Titnore Lane) hosts the 1981 ATP Challenger Series tennis tournament
 1987 - Gary Bevans begins work creating a replica of the ceiling of the Sistine Chapel in Rome at English Martyrs' Catholic Church, Goring-by-Sea
 1988 - Alan Martin and Jamie Hewlett create the character Tank Girl while at college in Worthing
 1990 - Sterns Nightclub opens
 1991 - Population: 98,066
 1992 - Turning Tides homeless charity formed (initially as Worthing Churches Homeless Projects)
 1993 - Worthing Bears win the British Basketball League
 1994
 Worthing Borough Council is led by the Liberal Democrats for the first time
 Premises on Ivy Arch Road are purchased and developed into Worthing's first mosque, the Masjid Assalam
 1997 - Two new constituencies are created - East Worthing and Shoreham (won by Tim Loughton) and Worthing West (won by Sir Peter Bottomley)
 1999
 Control of Worthing Borough Council returns to the Conservative Party
 Worthing Thunder Basketball Club is formed, initially as the Worthing Rebels

21st century
 2001 - Population: 97,540
 2002 - Control of Worthing Borough Council returns to the Liberal Democrats
 2004 - Control of Worthing Borough Council returns to the Conservative Party
 2008 - First Worthing International Birdman event is held
 2010
 The South Downs National Park is formed, to include parts of Worthing
 The Sussex International Piano Competition is founded in Worthing
 2011 - Population: 104,640
 2013
 Kingmere Marine Conservation Zone is created off of the coast of Worthing
 Splashpoint Leisure Centre opens
 2014 - Worthing becomes a founding partner of the Greater Brighton City Region
 2018
 The first Worthing Pride event takes place
 Rampion Wind Farm becomes operational off the coast of Worthing
 2019
 Bayside Vista becomes Worthing's tallest building at 
 Worthing Borough Council declares a climate emergency, which aims to see the council carbon-neutral by 2030.
 2022 - Worthing Borough Council is led by the Labour Party for the first time

See also 
 History of Worthing
 Timeline of Sussex history
Other towns in the historic county of Sussex:
 Timeline of Brighton
 Timeline of Horsham

References

Bibliography
 

.

Worthing